Luis Barbero Fernández (8 August 1916 – 3 August 2005) was a Spanish actor. He appeared in more than 150 films and television shows between 1957 and 2001. In 2000, he was awarded with a Lifetime Achievement Award from the Spanish Actors Union. He died of a heart attack in 2005.

Selected filmography

 El hombre que viajaba despacito (1957) - Hombre en estación
 Historias de Madrid (1958) - Empleado municipal
 El día de los enamorados (1959) - Encargado en la Tienda de Deportes
 Vuelve San Valentín (1962)
 La gran familia (1962) - El cartero
 El juego de la verdad (1963)
 Marisol rumbo a Río (1963) - Don Braulio
 El pecador y la bruja (1964)
 Casi un caballero (1964) - Cliente en el Hotel
 Búsqueme a esa chica (1964) - Lucas
 Per un pugno nell'occhio (1965) - Contratante
 Mi canción es para ti (1965) - Farmacéutico
 Cabriola (1965) - Portero Plaza de Toros
 Snakes and Ladders (1965) - Recepcionista Hotel
 Las últimas horas... (1966)
 Las viudas (1966) - Mariano (segment "Luna de miel)
 Jugando a morir (1966) - Basilio
 Un millón en la basura (1967) - Portero casa Don Leonardo
 ¿Qué hacemos con los hijos? (1967)
 Novios 68 (1967) - Don Joaquín
 Un día es un día (1968) - Empleado de Don Honorio
 Blood in the Bullring (1969) - Jorge
 Cuatro noches de boda (1969) - Tío de Joaquín
 Con ella llegó el amor (1970) - Caprini
 Cateto a babor (1970) - Alfredo, visitante de Enriqueta
 Después de los nueve meses (1970) - Padre de Rosario
 Dele color al difunto (1970) - Don Matías
 El sobre verde (1971) - Bombero
 Las siete vidas del gato (1971) - Camarero
 Hay que educar a papá (1971) - Jugador de Mus #2
 Una chica casi decente (1971) - Mirón en el pase de bikinis
 Las ibéricas F.C. (1971) - Fan with binoculars
 Simón, contamos contigo (1971) - Director de la delegación de la Editorial
 Mi querida señorita (1972)
 La cera virgen (1972) - Médico
 La garbanza negra, que en paz descanse... (1972) - Don José
 Ligue Story (1972) - Médico (uncredited)
 Las colocadas (1972) - Admirador
 Guapo heredero busca esposa (1972) - Funcionario #1
 La curiosa (1973) - Don Valentín
 La descarriada (1973) - Vendedor de aspiradoras eléctricas
 Una monja y un Don Juan (1973) - Abuelo rebelde (uncredited)
 La llamaban La Madrina (1973) - El abuelo
 El abuelo tiene un plan (1973) - Guarda zoológico
 Me has hecho perder el juicio (1973) - Padre de Manolo
 Watch Out, We're Mad! (1974) - Jeremias
 Señora doctor (1974) - Hilario
 Matrimonio al desnudo (1974) - Don Basi
 El reprimido (1974)
 Las obsesiones de Armando (1974) - Recepcionista
 Polvo eres... (1974) - Don Emilio - el párroco
 El insólito embarazo de los Martínez (1974) - Cura
 Mi mujer es muy decente, dentro de lo que cabe (1975) - Sr. Guruceta
 Una abuelita de antes de la guerra (1975) - Cura Viejo
 No quiero perder la honra (1975) - Silvestre
 No matarás (1975) - Doctor
 El adúltero (1975) - Médico
 Zorrita Martinez (1975) - Sacerdote
 El mejor regalo (1975) - Don Luciano
 Nosotros, los decentes (1976) - Don Dimas
 La mujer es cosa de hombres (1976) - Sacerdote
 Esclava te doy (1976) - Narciso
 Madrid, Costa Fleming (1976) - Señor ambulancia
 Ligeramente viudas (1976)
 El señor está servido (1976) - Recuero
 Un día con Sergio (1976) - Practicante
 Fulanita y sus menganos (1976) - Emir Abdul Abbas
 Mauricio, mon amour (1976) - Don Braulio
 Los hijos de... (1976) - Vendedor de cupones
 Haz la loca... no la guerra (1976) - Comprador 1
 El bengador Gusticiero y su pastelera madre (1977) - Anciano
 Eva, limpia como los chorros del oro (1977) - Don Cosme
 Celedonio y yo somos así (1977) - Alcalde
 Gusanos de seda (1977) - Cura
 Niñas... al salón (1977) - Cura
 Casa de citas (1978)
 Donde hay patrón... (1978) - Cosme
 Suave, cariño, muy suave (1978) - Médico
 Fantasma en el Oeste (1978)
 El virgo de Visanteta (1979) - El cura
 La insólita y gloriosa hazaña del cipote de Archidona (1979) - Abuelo de Conchi
 Historia de 'S''' (1979) - Paciente Zoófilo
 Visanteta, estáte quieta (1979) - Cura
 Los bingueros (1979) - Cegato
 And in the Third Year, He Rose Again (1980) - Hombre en banco del parque (uncredited)
 El alcalde y la política (1980) - Fulgencio
 Unos granujas decentes (1980) - González
 Los locos vecinos del 2º (1980) - Don Ángel
 Un cero a la izquierda (1980) - Borracho
 ¿Dónde estará mi niño? (1981) - Jacinto
 Los chulos (1981) - Rector del seminario
 El soplagaitas (1981) - Sebastián
 El Profesor erótico (1981) - Padre de Margarita
 La tía de Carlos (1982) - Don Francisco Chinchilla
 All Is Possible in Granada (1982) - Falsificador
 Los autonómicos (1982) - Melecio
 Loca por el circo (1982) - Manolo
 En busca del huevo perdido (1982) - Veterinario
 La colmena (1982) - Pepe
 Le llamaban J.R. (1982) - Marqués de Puerto Espiche
 Chispita y sus gorilas (1982) - Portero
 Martes y trece, ni te cases ni te embarques (1982) - Padre Vázquez
 La seta ibérica (1982) - Don Arturo
 De camisa vieja a chaqueta nueva (1982) - Víctor
 The Autonomines (1983) - Nicomedes padre
 Agítese antes de usarla (1983) - Párroco
 Los caraduros (1983) - Restaurant Customer (uncredited)
 Y del seguro... líbranos Señor! (1983) - Alonso
 Al este del oeste (1984) - Mr. First
 Cuando Almanzor perdió el tambor (1984)
 Padre nuestro (1985) - Sagrario
 ¡Qué tía la C.I.A.! (1985) - Amante de Amancia
 El suizo - un amour en Espagne (1985)
 A la pálida luz de la luna (1985) - Barman
 El donante (1985) - Don Pedro
 Cara de acelga (1987) - Hombre Hospital
 Madrid (1987)
 El Lute: Run for Your Life (1987) - Sacerdote
 Las cosas del querer (1989)
 Yo soy ésa (1990) - Abuelo de Ana
 The Dumbfounded King (1991) - Ferrán de Valdivieso
 Los gusanos no llevan bufanda (1992) - Hombre burgués
 On the Far Side of the Tunnel (1994) - Prior
 Corazón loco'' (1997) - Anciano

References

External links

1916 births
2005 deaths
Spanish male film actors
Male actors from Madrid
20th-century Spanish male actors